The One Pro Wrestling (1PW) Tag Team Championship was a professional wrestling tag team championship in One Pro Wrestling. The title was established in 2006. Title reigns are determined by professional wrestling matches with different wrestlers, involved in pre-existing scripted feuds, plots and storylines. Wrestlers are portrayed as either villains or fan favorites as they follow a series of tension-building events, which culminate into a wrestling match or series of matches for the championship.

Title history

References
General

Specific

External links
1PW website
1PW Tag Team Championship History

One Pro Wrestling championships
Tag team wrestling championships